This is a list of the Hitkrant Europarade number-one singles of 1965.

References

Lists of number-one songs in Europe
1965 record charts